Blastobasis christou is a moth in the family Blastobasidae that is endemic to New Caledonia.

The distal 2/3 of the forewings is pale brown intermixed with a few brown and pale grey scales. The hindwings are pale greyish brown.

Etymology
The species is named in honour of Jason Michael Christou.

References

Moths described in 2002
Endemic fauna of New Caledonia
Blastobasis